The Journal of Research in Nursing is a bimonthly peer-reviewed nursing journal that covers the field of nursing. The editors-in-chief are Andree Le May (University of Southampton) and Ann McMahon. The journal was established in 1996 and is published by SAGE Publications.

Abstracting and indexing 
The journal is abstracted and indexed in Applied Social Sciences Index & Abstracts, British Nursing Index, and CINAHL.

External links 
 

SAGE Publishing academic journals
English-language journals
General nursing journals
Bimonthly journals
Publications established in 1995